State Route 18 (SR 18) is an east–west highway in northern Ohio. It is the sixth longest state route in the state.  Its western terminus is at the Indiana state line near Hicksville, where the route continues in Indiana as State Road 8, and its eastern terminus is at State Route 91 in Akron.

History
State Route 18 was an original state highway that went from Norwalk to the Pennsylvania state line.  The route was extended to the Indiana state line in 1926.  Until 1950, it was one of a very few Ohio routes to end at two state lines.

State Route 18's extension to the Indiana state line originally overlapped State Route 2 from the line to Hicksville.  In 1940, State Route 18 was rerouted on the former State Route 193 from the line to Hicksville.

In 1950, State Route 18's eastern terminus was moved to Youngstown.  Its old route to the Pennsylvania state line was recertified as State Route 289.

In 1966, the route was routed along State Route 8 and Interstate 80S (now Interstate 76) to Youngstown.  This series of concurrencies ended in 1971, and State Route 18 would eventually be routed along Market Street in Akron, to end at its current terminus.

In 1969, State Route 18 was routed concurrently with U.S. Route 20 along the Norwalk Bypass, a limited access freeway.  Prior to the Bypass route, State Route 18 followed Main Street and Woodlawn Avenue (formerly known as Medina Street) and later followed Main Street and Akron Road through the city of Norwalk (much of this alignment was already concurrent with US 20).

Before the rerouting of SR 18 via SR 8 and I-80S, SR 18 left West Market Street at Twin Oaks Drive in West Akron, where it went a few blocks east to North Portage Path, then jogged 1 block north to Memorial Parkway, which became Tallmadge Avenue east of the Cuyahoga River (before that, SR 18 continued along Market Street, then joined with SR 8 before reaching Tallmadge Avenue).

Tallmadge Road was a straight east/west road which became Mahoning Avenue as it approached the Youngstown area.

Most stretches of former SR 18 are still referred to as County Road 18 in Portage and Mahoning Counties.

SR 18 was realigned around North Baltimore on a two-lane  bypass completed in 2012. The new bypass, which included a roundabout at the eastern transition to the original route, was built to facilitate traffic to a new CSX rail yard in Henry Township. The old route through North Baltimore became signed as SR 18 Business.

Major intersections

SR 18 Business

State Route 18 Business (SR 18 Bus.) is a  business route through the village of North Baltimore in southern Wood County. The route starts at a T-intersection with SR 18 in Henry Township and runs east into North Baltimore on Deshler Road and West State Street. In the center of the village, the route heads south onto South Main Street. SR 18 Bus. ends at a roundabout with SR 18 in the southern limits of the village.

SR 18 Bus. was created in November 2012 along what used to be SR 18 through North Baltimore. When SR 18 was rerouted on a bypass of the village in 2012, the old route became a signed business route. Most of the business route was designated by the Ohio Department of Transportation as SR 18-J though a portion of the route near its western terminus was designated SR 18-C.  those designations have been removed and ODOT no longer maintains the business route.

References

External links

018
Transportation in Defiance County, Ohio
Transportation in Henry County, Ohio
Transportation in Wood County, Ohio
Transportation in Hancock County, Ohio
Transportation in Seneca County, Ohio
Transportation in Sandusky County, Ohio
Transportation in Huron County, Ohio
Transportation in Lorain County, Ohio
Transportation in Medina County, Ohio
Transportation in Summit County, Ohio